Matthe Hadithu Kogile (Kannada: ಮತ್ತೆ ಹಾಡಿತು ಕೋಗಿಲೆ) is a 1990 Indian Kannada film, directed by H. R. Bhargava and produced by S. Shankar. The film stars Vishnuvardhan, Baby Shyamili, Anant Nag, Bhavya and Rupini. The film has musical score by Rajan–Nagendra. The film was a romantic drama. Vishnuvardhan and Anant Nag co-starred together for the first time. They would follow it up a few years later with Nishkarsha.

Director Bhargava had revealed that he was so enchanted with the movie Naa Ninna Mareyalare on which he worked as an associate that he requested Chi. Udayashankar for a similar themed movie - a tragic love story between hero and heroine where the hero named Anand has a constant companion in the form of bike. Udayashankar handed over a story which he had written for Rajkumar who had rejected it citing he had already worked on a similar themed movie - a hero taking care of an abandoned child - in Devara Makkalu.

Plot
Anand (Vishnuvardhan) is a stage singer. He lives with his best friend Gopal (Ramesh Bhat). Sangeetha (Rupini) is a daughter of rich businessman Vishwaprasad. Kavitha (Bhavya) is a close friend to Anand and also secretly loves him, but she doesn't express her feelings to him. Sangeetha and Anand fall for each other, but Sangeetha's father dislikes Anand. He fixes Sangeetha's marriage with his business partner, Younger Brother NRI Businessman Prasan Kumar (Anant Nag).
 
Vishwaprasad makes a plan and engages Anand at a concert in Chennai and arranges Sangeetha's marriage with Prasanna Kumar. Anand tries to stop the marriage but gets attacked by Vishwaprasad's goons. In a tough fight he gets hit on the head, loses consciousness and is admitted to the hospital. 

Sangeetha is forcibly maarried to Prasanna Kumar and tries to commit suicide by taking poison on the first night. Prasanna Kumar admits her to the hospital. Anand visits Sangeetha only to make her promise not to try such foolish acts again, and advises her to accept Prasanna Kumar as her husband.

After several months, Sangeetha dies while delivering a baby girl. Prasanna Kumar faces problems as a single parent. His brother suggests that he remarry. Prasanna Kumar decides to marry a poor family girl for his child's benefit and gets married to Savitha, Kavitha's younger sister.

After the marriage, Savitha expresses her dislike for the child and leaves home. Prasanna Kumar considers donating his child for adoption. Initially reluctant, but as Kavitha reveals the details of Sangeetha and Anand's friendship and suggests Anand would be the right person to take care of the child, Prasanna decides to give his child to Anand. Anand happily adopts and names the child Pallavi and raises her like his own daughter. Savitha faces abortion and loses her child-bearing potential. 

After six years grown Pallavi (Shamlee) and Anand are living as a happy family. Anand teaches her music and dance. Prasanna and Savitha come back from America and see Anand and Pallavi's singing concert. Prasanna tells her about Pallavi, his own daughter. Savitha likes Pallavi and requests Prasanna to bring her back to her house where she will take care of her. Prasanna also likes Pallavi, so he went to Anand's home to request he give the child to him. Anand sadly gives Pallavi to Prasanna. 

Prasanna and Savitha bring Pallavi back to their family, but Pallavi is sad and unable to accept them as her parents, as she still feels Anand as her own father. The next day, Prasanna holds a cocktail party for to his friends at home. Pallavi accidentally drinks alcohol then becomes unconscious. Prasanna admits her to the hospital. Anand sadly sings a song, "Matte Haditu Kole," to wake up the unconscious Pallavi. Pallavi recovers from the song and runs toward Anand. Finally, Prasanna realizes that only Anand can take care of Pallavi and decides not to interfere in Pallavi's life. 
After some time, Anand marries Kavitha. Anand sings with Pallavi on stage.

Cast

Vishnuvardhan as Anand
Anant Nag as Prasan Kumar
Bhavya as Kavitha
Rupini as Sangeetha
Baby Shyamili as Pallavi
Sathyashree as Savitha
Mukhyamantri Chandru as Pradeep
Ramesh Bhat as Gopal
Ashok Rao as Vishwaprasad
Doddanna as Santhosh

Soundtrack 
All the songs composed by Rajan–Nagendra, written by Chi. Udayashankar.

References

External links
 
 

1990 films
1990s Kannada-language films
Films scored by Rajan–Nagendra
Films directed by H. R. Bhargava